Heinz Schwarz (24 July 1928 – 6 March 2023) was a German politician of the Christlich Demokratische Union Deutschlands (CDU) who was a long-time member of the state parliament of Rhineland-Palatinate, serving as the state's minister of the interior. From 1976 to 1990, he was a member of the Bundestag.

Life and work 
Schwarz was born in Leubsdorf on 24 July 1928, the son of a vintner and innkeeper. He attended elementary, trade and viticulture schools. In 1944 he began a commercial apprenticeship at the Kreissparkasse in Neuwied, but was drafted as a Luftwaffenhelfer. After World War II, he completed his commercial education in 1947. He trained as a banker until 1947, and then worked in his parents' vineyard and at times as an industrial labourer. He owned two companies in his hometown, an antique shop and a company that imported raw materials.

Party 
Schwarz joined the Christlich Demokratische Union Deutschlands (CDU) in 1947. From 1949 to 1951 he was the head of CDU's Neuwied Kreisverband (district). He was state secretary of the Junge Union youth organisation from 1952 to 1954, and its national secretary from 1955 to 1961. He was responsible for the party in Rhineland-Palatinate from 1961 to 1964, and head of the district Koblenz-Montabaur from 1969 to 1980. In 2020, he was one of only two people to be present at all party conventions of the CDU since the founding convention in 1950. The other was Günter-Helge Strickstrack, who died that year.

Member of parliament 
Schwarz was a member of the council of Leubsdorf from 1956 to 1960, and a member of the district council of Landkreis Neuwied from 1956 to 1971. He was elected to the Landtag of Rhineland-Palatinate in 1959, where he served as deputy president of the CDU from 1967 to 1971, and as president of the Innenausschuss (interior affairs). He was elected to the national parliament, Bundestag, in 1976 where he remained until 1990.

Public positions 

Schwarz was mayor of Bad Hönningen from 1964 to 1971. On 18 May 1971, he was appointed by minister-president Helmut Kohl as minister of the interior, succeeding .

Personal life and death 
Schwarz was married; the couple's son  also became a politician. Their second son is publicist .

Schwarz died on 6 March 2023, at age 94. He was the last living member of the 1959 Landtag. Malu Dreyer, minister-president of Rhineland-Palatinate, said "Heinz Schwarz was a politician out of deep conviction. As a Rhenish Catholic who lived through the Second World War, he was concerned with a better future for our country, in which people build bridges for a firm democracy." ("").

Awards 

 1969: Order of Merit of the Federal Republic of Germany
 1986: Commander Cross of the Order of Merit
 1989:

Publications 

Publications by Schwarz as author or editor are held by the German National Library:

Memorial 
Schwarz donated a memorial monument at the Ludendorff Bridge in Remagen, where he had served as Luftwaffenhelfer. The plaque, on the east bak of the river in Erpel, quotes Konrad Adenauer: "Friede ohne Freiheit ist kein Friede" ("Peace without freedom is no peace").

Cabinet 
 Second Kohl cabinet (Rhineland-Palatinate) Minister of the Interior 1971–1975
 Third Kohl cabinet (Rhineland-Palatinate) Minister of the Interior 1975–1976

References

External links 

 Bestandsübersicht über Deposita zu Heinz Schwarz Archiv für christlich-demokratische Politik (KAS)

1928 births
2023 deaths
People from Neuwied (district)
Members of the Landtag of Rhineland-Palatinate
Members of the Bundestag for the Christian Democratic Union of Germany
Members of the Bundestag for Rhineland-Palatinate
Commanders Crosses of the Order of Merit of the Federal Republic of Germany
Luftwaffenhelfer